Lyndon Baines Johnson High School or LBJ High School is a public high school located in Johnson City, Texas (USA) and classified as a 3A school by the UIL. It is part of the Johnson City Independent School District located in north central Blanco County. In 1963, the school was renamed in honor of President Lyndon B. Johnson who was a 1924 graduate of Johnson City High School. In 2015, the school was rated "Met Standard" by the Texas Education Agency.

Athletics
While the school's official name is LBJ High, the athletic teams go by Johnson City.   The Eagles compete in the following sports 

Baseball
Basketball
Cross Country
Football
Softball
Tennis
Track and Field
Volleyball

State Titles
Baseball 
2011(1A)
Boys Basketball 
1947(B)

Band
Marching Band State Champions 
1989(2A)

References

External links

Johnson City ISD

Schools in Blanco County, Texas
Public high schools in Texas